Blackfoot Dam is a dam in Caribou County, Idaho, in the eastern part of the state.

It impounds the Blackfoot River of Idaho for flood control and irrigation water storage primarily for the Fort Hall Indian Reservation. The dam is owned and operated by the Bureau. Its construction came eight years before the 1919 formation of Caribou County.

The reservoir it creates, Blackfoot Reservoir, has a water surface of 18,000 acres, and a maximum capacity of 413,000 acre-feet. Blackfoot Dam impounds the river at the northwestern end of the reservoir; the China Hat Dam towards the southwest of the reservoir was constructed in 1923 to resolve seepage problems.  Recreation includes fishing for rainbow and cutthroat trout, as well as carp.

References

Dams in Idaho
Reservoirs in Idaho
United States Bureau of Indian Affairs dams
Dams completed in 1911
Buildings and structures in Caribou County, Idaho
Lakes of Caribou County, Idaho
1911 establishments in Idaho
Native American history of Idaho